Maso di Banco (working c 1335–1350) was an Italian painter of the 14th century, who worked in Florence, Italy. He and Taddeo Gaddi were the most prominent Florentine pupils of Giotto di Bondone, exploring the three-dimensional dramatic realism inaugurated by Giotto.  

Maso's name and work are known to us from  Lorenzo Ghiberti's autobiographical I Commentari, which identifies frescoes in the chapel of the Holy Confessors at Santa Croce, Florence as his chief work.  The frescoes, not signed or dated but probably c 1340, represent scenes from the Life of St. Sylvester (Pope Sylvester I), the Last Judgment, and The Entombment.

His fresco of a particular judgment is in the Bardi banking family chapel of Santa Croce. It features Gualtiero de' Bardi pleading on behalf of his soul before Jesus Christ.

Nanni di Banco, a sculptor of the early 15th century, is not related to Maso.

Selected works
 Triptych,  Detroit Institute of Art 
 Portable altarpiece depicting Madonna and Christ Child with Saints and Scenes From The Life of Christ at Brooklyn Museum 
 Panel depicting The Coronation of the Virgin at the Budapest Museum of Fine Art

Notes

External links 
 Gallery of Art Online
Italian Paintings: Florentine School, a collection catalog containing information about di Banco and his works (see pages: 20–22).

14th-century Italian painters
Italian male painters
Trecento painters
Painters from Florence
1348 deaths
Year of birth unknown